The Chicago, Rock Island and Pacific Railroad Passenger Station is a historic building located in Iowa City, Iowa, United States.  Built in 1898 for passenger use, it was the second depot in the city.  The first one was built by the Mississippi and Missouri Railroad, a predecessor of the Chicago, Rock Island and Pacific Railroad (CRI&P), in 1855. This one was built through the efforts of Harry Breene, the local Rock Island agent. W.K. McFarlin, CRI&P's superintendent of maintenance and construction oversaw the building's construction. Architecturally, it is a combination of the Richardsonian Romanesque and Victorian Romanesque.  The depot was built to similar designs of stations in Ottawa, Illinois, and Council Bluffs, Iowa. 

Service included the CRI&P's Corn Belt Rocket and Rocky Mountain Rocket passenger lines. In the trains' final year there, the route was shortened to Chicago to Council Bluffs.

The depot ceased operations in 1970, although the railroad continued to maintain offices here. In 1982 (two years after the Rock Island ceased operations) it was acquired by a couple of attorneys for their offices. It was listed on the National Register of Historic Places the same year.  The building sits adjacent to the Iowa Interstate Railroad lines, and the railroad has operated occasional excursion trains that have stopped at the former depot.

References

Railway stations in the United States opened in 1898
Railway stations closed in 1970
National Register of Historic Places in Iowa City, Iowa
Railway stations on the National Register of Historic Places in Iowa
Iowa City
Former railway stations in Iowa
Transportation buildings and structures in Johnson County, Iowa